Deives Thiago Santos da Silva (born April 1, 1982) is a Brazilian football player, currently plays in Noroeste.

Career
Deives Thiago played for Grêmio in the 2004 Campeonato Brasileiro Série A.

Club statistics

References

External links

Júbilo Iwata

1982 births
Living people
Brazilian footballers
Footballers from Porto Alegre
Brazilian expatriate footballers
Campeonato Brasileiro Série A players
J1 League players
Júbilo Iwata players
Grêmio Foot-Ball Porto Alegrense players
Ceará Sporting Club players
Esporte Clube Noroeste players
Luverdense Esporte Clube players
Expatriate footballers in Japan
Association football midfielders